The 1997–98 Austrian Hockey League season was the 68th season of the Austrian Hockey League, the top level of ice hockey in Austria. Six teams participated in the league, and VEU Feldkirch won the championship.

Regular season

Playoffs

External links
Austrian Ice Hockey Association

Aus
1997–98 in Austrian ice hockey leagues
Austrian Hockey League seasons